Cheyyur , is a town in Chengalpattu district in the Indian state of Tamil Nadu. Cheyyur is surrounded by four sub-areas: North, East, South and West Cheyyur. The town has a Taluk Office (administrative offices) and a regional treasury centre.

Geography 
Cheyyur is a gate of chennai in south.
It is situated 29 km from Madurantakam, Chengalpattu district.

History 
The town has been renamed multiple times in the past. It was previously called Jayamkonda Chola Nallur, Veerarajendra Nallur, Jayamkonda-Cholapuram, Seyyur, Seigaiyampathy, and Valavappuri.

Population
Census Parameter	Census Data
Total Population	10664
Total No of Houses	2626
Female Population % 50.5% ( 5390)
Total Literacy rate % 74.4% ( 7936)
Female Literacy rate 35.1% ( 3746)
Scheduled Tribes Population % 1.2% ( 131)
Scheduled Caste Population % 48.6% ( 5188)
Working Population % 43.2%
Child(0 -6) Population by 2011	1024
Girl Child(0 -6) Population % by 2011 47.8% ( 489)

The area originally consisted of dense forests used for hunting by the Chola kings.

Transport 
Cheyyur is accessible by public transport (bus) from Madurantagam.
ECR Cheyyur junction (Ellai amman temple)

Economy 
A weekly market called "Sandhai" is hosted in Cheyyur every Thursday. Fishing and agriculture are the most common activities.

Major Resource
Salt production (largest canal between koovathur and marakkanam)
Agriculture 
Fishing

Temples
Sri Kandaswamy Temple before called seiyur murugan temple, also called the Cheyyur Shiva Temple, is an 800-year-old temple. It was built during the reign of the Chola kings. A shrine near the Shiva Temple is dedicated to Lord Muruga. The origin of the town's name is connected to this shrine. Previously, the town's name was pronounced as "Seyyur", from the word "Sei", meaning "infant".

Churches
The Our Lady of Good Voyage Church was established in 1716 and is one of the standing relics of the missionary services. Local missionaries contributed to economic and academic development by starting or supporting schools and skill development centers as well as providing medical services. The Church of South India in Asia and a Pentecostal church represented by Assemblies of God.                              Cheyyur AG Church was established in 1993 under the charge of Pastor Stephen Pal.

The biggest denomination of ECI built a church on 3 November at Pakkur Manalmeadu. Arputha Jotgi is the current pastor.

Sisters of Cluny 
The Foundation at Cheyyur is the 16th House of Cluny in India. It was the first missionary post for French Sisters in rural India. At the request of Reverend Fr. Grandjanny, MEP, the Parish Priest of Cheyyur, four Sisters of St. Joseph of Cluny arrived in Cheyyur from Tindivanam on 24 March 1904. A house and dispensary for the Sisters was built and furnished by Fr. Grandjanny. A Grotto was constructed near the Dispensary and was blessed on 8 September 1912. A bell was sent from France by the Mother General to facilitate common life in the convent. On 22 November 1916 and 28 May 1917, cyclones hit and robbers broke into the house. On 13 December 1999, 6 Sisters were killed when the roof collapsed around 1:30 a.m. Only one nun escaped.

Industries
Marg Swarnaboomi (New Chennai township) Project.
 
Zwelling India private Ltd.
Altek Beissel Needles Ltd.

The Government of India has proposed to develop a 4000 MW Ultra Mega Power Plant (UMPP) at Cheyyur.

Education
Below are a few local educational institutes.
Govt Boys Higher Secondary School
Govt Girls Higher Secondary School
Little Flower Girls Higher Secondary School
St. Mary's Boys Higher Secondary School
Marg Institute of Design & Architecture Swarnabhoomi, Cheyyur
Adhiparasakthi Polytechnic College  
Adhiparasakhthi College of Pharmacy 
MARG Navajyothi Vidyalaya - CBSE School
Crescent Matriculation Higher Secondary School
Panchayat Union Primary Schools
Sri Ramakrishna Vidyalaya Metric Higher Secondary School
Saint Exupery metric Higher Secondary School
Layola Metric Higher Secondary School
Thondamanallur Panchayat Middle School

Tourist Place
Othiyur Lake
Muthaliyar kuppam Boat house
Alamparai Fort Kadappakam
Lake view Road
Kandhaswamy Temple
Kurumbarai

References

Cities and towns in Chengalpattu district